Michael Elliott may refer to:

 Michael Elliott (chemist) (1924–2007), British chemist
 Michael Elliott (director) (1931–1984), English director
 Michael Elliott (politician) (born 1932), British politician, MEP in European Parliament election, 1999 (United Kingdom)
 Michael A. Elliott, American literary scholar, president of Amherst College
 Michael J. Elliott (1951–2016), journalist and CEO of the anti-poverty advocacy organization ONE
 Michael "Otshibe" Elliott, Esports player, Mixologist Enthusiast

See also  
 Mike Elliott (disambiguation)